Jehoiachin's rations tablets date from the 6th century BC and describe the oil rations set aside for a royal captive identified with Jeconiah, king of Judah. Tablets from the royal archives of Nebuchadnezzar king of Babylon were unearthed in the ruins of Babylon that contain food rations paid to captives and craftsmen who lived in and around the city. On one of the tablets, "Ya’u-kīnu, king of the land of Yahudu" is mentioned along with his five sons listed as royal princes.

Excavation
The tablets were excavated from Babylon during 1899–1917 by Robert Koldewey and were stored in a barrel-vaulted underground building consisting of rows of rooms near the Ishtar Gate.

Translation
The tablets' text states:
Babylon 28122: "...t[o] Ia-'-u-kin, king..."
Babylon 28178: "10 (sila of oil) to ...Ia-'-kin, king of Ia[...] 2 sila to [...so]ns of the king of Ia-a-hu-du"
Babylon 28186: "10 (sila) to Ia-ku-u-ki-nu, the son of the king of Ia-ku-du, 2 sila for the 5 sons of the king of Ia-ku-du"

Another tablet reads:
1 sila (oil) for three carpenters from Arvad,  apiece,
11 sila for eight woodworkers from Byblos, . . .
3 sila for seven Greek craftsman,  sila apiece,
 sila to the carpenter, Nabuetir
10 sila to Ia-ku-u-ki-nu, the king of Judah’s son,
2 sila for the five sons of the Judean king. 

A sila is a Babylonian unit of capacity equivalent to approximately 800 mL (1.7 US pints).

See also
List of artifacts significant to the Bible
Biblical archaeology (excavations and artifacts)

References

6th-century BC inscriptions
Babylon
Clay tablets
Biblical archaeology
Nebuchadnezzar II
Akkadian inscriptions